This is a list of airports in Italy, grouped by region and sorted by location.

Airports
Airport names shown in bold have scheduled passenger service on commercial airlines.

See also
 Transport in Italy
 List of airports by ICAO code: L#LI – Italy
 List of the busiest airports in Italy
 Wikipedia:WikiProject Aviation/Airline destination lists: Europe#Italy

References
 
 
  – includes IATA codes
  – IATA and ICAO airport codes
  (login required)

Footnotes

 
Italy
Airports
Airports
Italy